Mustafa Nano (born  4 janar. 1960 Shijak, Durrës) is an Albanian political analyst, journalist and writer.

Having been a former member of the Albanian Democratic Party, he switched careers from politics to journalism where he started working in the Shekulli paper in 1997.  In his writings he espouses a liberal-progressive worldview. Other newspapers that he has worked with are Korrieri and Shqip. He is also the author of three essay books.

References

1960 births
Living people
Albanian male writers
21st-century Albanian writers
Albanian journalists
Albanian publishers (people)
Albanian novelists
21st-century novelists
University of Tirana alumni
Albanian-language writers